Miraculous: Tales of Ladybug & Cat Noir is a French CGI action/adventure animated series produced by Zagtoon and Method Animation, in co-production with Toei Animation, SAMG Animation, and De Agostini S.p.A. The series features two Parisian teenagers, Marinette Dupain-Cheng and Adrien Agreste, who transform into the superheroes Ladybug and Cat Noir, respectively, to protect the city from supervillains which are created by the supervillain Hawk Moth. It airs in over 150 countries, each with its own order of episodes; this list of episodes will follow the airing order in France (on TFOU).

Prior to its debut in France on 19 October 2015 on TF1, the series was first shown in South Korea on 1 September 2015 on EBS1. In the United States, the series originally debuted on Nickelodeon on 6 December 2015 before the show was removed from the network's schedule in 2016. On 8 April 2019, the series was officially picked up by Disney Channel and began airing since then. It also aired on the KidsClick programming block until its shutdown on 31 March 2019. In the United Kingdom and Ireland, the show premiered on 30 January 2016 on Disney Channel.

On 20 November 2015, producer Jeremy Zag announced that a second and third season were in progress. On 20 December 2016, Zag announced that Netflix had acquired USA video-on-demand streaming rights to Miraculous for seasons 1–3, including the English premiere of the Christmas Special. The second season premiered in France on TF1's TFOU block on 26 October 2017, and other channels throughout Europe. The world premiere of Season 3 was in Spain and Portugal on Disney Channel on 1 December 2018. In France on TFOU it premiered on 14 April 2019.
On 22 January 2018, Zag posted on Instagram that the crew was working on season 4 and season 5. On 7 September 2019, it was confirmed by Jeremy Zag on his Instagram that seasons 4 and 5 are on the way and air date for season 4 was slated for late 2020, but it was pushed to 2021, due to the effects of the COVID-19 pandemic. On 13 October 2019, Thomas Astruc announced that scripts for season 4 have been done.

On 17 March 2021, it was confirmed that the fourth season's world premiere episode, "Furious Fu", would be aired in Brazil on Gloob on 23 March 2021. In France, the fourth season premiered on 11 April 2021, and on Disney Channel US premiered on 21 June 2021.

On 18 April 2021, it was announced that two new seasons, season 6 and season 7, were in production and are slated to premiere between 2023 and 2024.

Series overview

Episode list

(2015–16)

(2016–18)

Season 3 (2019)

Season 4 (2021–22)

Season 5 (2022–present)

Specials

Webisodes 

A series of webisodes, Miraculous: La Webserie, was released by TF1. They can also be found on the official YouTube channel of the cartoon. They contain clips from various episodes and are usually narrated by Marinette, who writes in her diary, or by the others. Nick also released the English version on their website as Miraculous Secrets (also A Miraculous Message), as well as on YouTube. A 2D-animated series of webisodes was also released, titled Miraculous: Tales from Paris (Miraculous, une journée à Paris).

Miraculous Secrets

Tales from Paris

Miraculous Zag Chibi

Films

Home media

Region 1 
In the United States and Canada, the first DVD, featuring seven episodes from season one, with both English and French audio tracks, was released on 3 May 2016 by Shout! Factory. 

A second DVD, subtitled Spots On!, which contains six episodes, was released on 30 August 2016. 

A third DVD, Be Miraculous, which contains seven episodes (including the two-part prequel), was released on 10 January 2017. 

A fourth DVD, It's Ladybug, was released on 11 April 2017.

A fifth DVD, Miraculous: Tales Of Ladybug & Cat Noir: Season One, was released on 6 February 2018.

Region 1 DVDs

Main Series

Region 2 Season 1 DVD 2017–2018 
In the UK, the first DVD, featuring 4 DVD episodes from season One called Miraculous: Tales of Ladybug and Cat Noir: Lady Wifi & Other Stories Vol 1 in English was released on 17 July 2017 by Spirit Entertainment.

A second DVD, Miraculous: Tales of Ladybug and Cat Noir - Kung Food & Other Stories Vol 2, was released on 6 November 2017.

A third DVD, Miraculous: Tales of Ladybug and Cat Noir - Princess Fragrance & Other Stories Vol 3, was released on 12 February 2018.

A fourth DVD, Miraculous: Tales of Ladybug and Cat Noir - Volpina & Other Stories Vol 4, which contains seven episodes (including the two-part prequel), was released on 21 May 2018. 

A fifth DVD, Miraculous: Tales Of Ladybug & Cat Noir: Season One, was released on 17 September 2018.

In the UK, the second DVD episodes, featuring 5 DVD episodes from season Two DVD, which is called Miraculous: Tales of Ladybug and Cat Noir - Gigantian & Other Stories, was released on 7 October 2019.

A DVD called, Miraculous: Tales of Ladybug and Cat Noir - A Christmas Special, from Season 2 was released on 11 November 2019.

A DVD called, Miraculous: Tales of Ladybug and Cat Noir - Gorizilla & Other Stories, from Season 2 was released on 17 February 2020.

A DVD called, Miraculous: Tales of Ladybug and Cat Noir - Sandboy & Other Stories, from Season 2 was released on 4 May 2020.

A DVD called, Miraculous: Tales of Ladybug and Cat Noir - Queen Wasp & Other Stories, from Season 2 was released on 13 July 2020.

A fifth DVD, Miraculous: Tales Of Ladybug & Cat Noir: Season Two, was released on 14 September 2020.

Region 2 DVDs

Main Series

Notes

References

External links 

 
 Miraculous at TF1 
 
 Official Japanese Website

Episodes
Lists of French animated television series episodes
Lists of children's television series episodes